Organisations named National Audiovisual Institute exist in several countries:

 National Audiovisual Institute (Finland)
 Institut national de l'audiovisuel (INA) (France)
  National Audiovisual Institute (NInA) (Poland)